Ryderwear is an Australian fitness apparel and accessories brand, manufacturer and retailer headquartered in South Australia.

See also

List of South Australian manufacturing businesses

References

External links

2009 establishments in Australia
Australian companies established in 2009
Online retailers of Australia
Clothing retailers of Australia
Manufacturing companies based in Adelaide
Family-owned companies of Australia
Clothing brands of Australia
Sportswear brands
Sporting goods manufacturers of Australia
Companies based in Adelaide
Health clubs in Australia